Kalyaana Sougandhikam is a 1975 Indian Malayalam-language film, directed by P. Vijayan. The film stars Jayabharathi, Adoor Bhasi, Thikkurissy Sukumaran Nair and Sreelatha Namboothiri. The film has musical score by Pukazhenthi.

Cast
 
Jayabharathi 
Adoor Bhasi 
Thikkurissy Sukumaran Nair 
Sreelatha Namboothiri 
Paravoor Bharathan 
Vincent 
Saleema

Soundtrack
The music was composed by Pukazhenthi.

References

External links
 

1975 films
1970s Malayalam-language films
Films scored by Pukazhenthi